Patricia Benoit (born Haiti) is a Haitian-American filmmaker. In 2012, she was critically acclaimed for her directorial venture on Stones in the Sun which was later screened at the 2012  Tribeca Film Festival where she won "Best New Narrative Director".

Biography 
Patricia Benoit was born in Haiti and her family was forced into exile under the Duvalier dictatorship and moved to France before moving to the US. She grew and raised up in Queens, New York.

Career 
In the 1990s, she became a filmmaker in New York. She worked with a Haitian-American novelist Edwidge Danticat and Jonathan Demme, on projects on Haitian art and documentaries about Haïti. Patricia Benoit directed a short film titled Fern's Heart of Darkness which appeared as one of the ten such short stories combined to produce a television film Subway Stories in 1997. Her documentary film titled Courage and Pain which portrayed about the victims of political torture in Haiti was shown at the Walter Reade Theatre in Newcastle York which was directed by her in 1996. She also directed an award-winning documentary titled Tonbe/Leve which depicts the struggle for democracy in Haiti after the end of Duvalier's 30 year rule.

She rose to prominence as a well known film director where she was critically acclaimed for her directorial venture of Stones in the Sun, a film based on the lives of Haitian people was released in 2012 accumulating positive reviews from the audience. The film Stones in the Sun received the best narrative feature film award at the Los Angeles Pan American Film Festival and also received the Africa Movie Academy Award for Best Diaspora Feature in 2013. At the Tribeca Film Festival, Patricia Benoit herself also received the special award for best debut narrative director.

Her short story "The Red Dress" was published in Edwidge Danticat's 2003 anthology The Butterfly's Way, subtitled Voices from the Haitian Dyaspora in the United States.

References

External links 
 

Date of birth missing (living people)
Living people
American film producers
American screenwriters
American women screenwriters
American television directors
American women television directors
American documentary film directors
Haitian film directors
American people of Haitian descent
People from Port-au-Prince
American women documentary filmmakers
Year of birth missing (living people)
21st-century American women